Nyack Beach State Park is a  state park in Upper Nyack, Rockland County, New York. It consists of a small parking lot and a riverfront pathway, the southernmost section of the Hudson River Valley Greenway.

The park is included within the Palisades Interstate Park system and is functionally part of a continuous complex of parks that also includes Rockland Lake State Park, Hook Mountain State Park, and Haverstraw Beach State Park.

History
The Palisades Interstate Park Commission purchased what was to become Nyack Beach State Park in 1911 to provide space for recreation, and to protect the land from the effects of quarrying that were impacting the Hudson River Palisades during the late 19th and early 20th centuries.

Along with a portion of adjacent Hook Mountain State Park, Nyack Beach was declared a National Natural Landmark in April 1980 for its portion of the Palisades Sill.

Park description
The park offers picnicking, hiking, bicycling, fishing, and cross-country skiing along the pathway.. The path is flat and handicapped accessible.  The pathway runs for  along the river towards Rockland Lake State Park.

As the name implies, the park originally included a swimming beach which has been closed for many years due to pollution in the Hudson River. In 2005, it was suggested that the beach could be reopened for swimming due to the improved condition of the river.

Wildlife
Hawks and raptors nest in the cliff and are easily viewed from the pathway. In 1994 there was a harbor seal at the park, and in 1995 a harbor seal spent much of August in the vicinity of the park. Fossils and dinosaur footprints have been found in the rocks along the pathway.

See also
List of New York state parks
List of National Natural Landmarks in New York

References

External links 
 New York State Parks: Nyack Beach State Park
 Palisades Park Conservancy: Nyack Beach State Park
 NY-NJTC: Nyack Beach State Park Details and Trail Info

Palisades Interstate Park system
National Natural Landmarks in New York (state)
Parks in Rockland County, New York
State parks of New York (state)